Michael Stanford Long (born October 29, 1938) is a former American football player who played with the Boston Patriots. He played college football at Brandeis University.

References

1938 births
Living people
American football ends
Brandeis Judges football players
Boston Patriots players